Thomas Hutchinson (bap. 1698, d. 1769) was an English clergyman and classical scholar.

Life
The son of Peter Hutchinson of Cornforth, in the parish of Bishop Middleham, Sedgefield, County Durham, he was baptised there on 17 May 1698. He matriculated at Lincoln College, Oxford, on 28 March 1715, and graduated B.A. 1718, M.A. 1721, B.D. (from Hart Hall) 1733, and D.D. 1738. In 1731 he was appointed rector of Lyndon, Rutland, having acquired a reputation as a scholar by the publication of an edition of Xenophon's Cyropaedia (1727). Thomas Herring, Archbishop of Canterbury, presented him to the vicarage of Horsham, Sussex, in 1748, and he held also the rectory of Cocking in the same county, and a prebendal stall in Chichester Cathedral. Dying at Horsham, he was buried there on 7 February 1769.

Works
He published several sermons and an essay on demoniacal possession, which attracted considerable notice.
 Xenophon's Cyropaedia - 1727
 Xenophon's Anabasis - 1735
 The Usual Interpretation of δαίμονες and δαιμονία [Daimones and Daimonia] - 1738.

References

Attribution

External links
Clerical career
Biography on Sussex People website

18th-century English Anglican priests
English classical scholars
1698 births
1769 deaths
People from Bishop Middleham